Alessandro Crescenzi, C.R.S. (1607 – 8 May 1688) was a Roman Catholic cardinal who served as Camerlengo of the Sacred College of Cardinals (1685–1688), Archbishop (Personal Title) of Recanati e Loreto (1676–1682), Titular Patriarch of Alexandria (1671–1676), Bishop of Bitonto (1652–1668), Bishop of Ortona a Mare e Campli (1644–1652), and Bishop of Termoli (1643–1644).

Biography
Alessandro Agostino Crescenzi was born in Rome, Italy, in 1607, the son of Giovanni Battista Crescenzi and Anna Massimi. He is related to Cardinal Marcello Crescenzi (named 1542) and is the nephew of Cardinal Pier Paolo Crescenzi (named 1611). He was ordained a priest in the Ordo Clericorum Regularium a Somascha.

On 13 July 1643, he was appointed Bishop of Termoli by Pope Urban VIII. In Rome, on 26 July 1643, he was consecrated bishop by Alessandro Cesarini (iuniore), Cardinal-Deacon of Sant'Eustachio.

On 13 June 1644, he was appointed Bishop of Ortona a Mare e Campli by Pope Urban VIII.

On 26 August 1652, he was appointed Bishop of Bitonto by Pope Innocent X. Pope Innocent X appointed him Apostolic Nuncio to Savoy (Turin), where he served until 1658.

On 14 May 1668, he resigned as Bishop of Bitonto. On 23 December 1670, he was named Prefect of the Cubiculi of His Holiness (Maestro di Camera) by Pope Clement X. On 19 January 1671, he was promoted by Pope Clement X to the titular post of Titular Patriarch of Alexandria. On 27 May 1675, he was installed as Cardinal Priest of Santa Prisca in the consistory of 1675.

On 24 February 1676, he was appointed Bishop of Recanati e Loreto by Pope Clement X, where he served until his resignation on 9 January 1682. As cardinal, he participated in the conclave of 1676 which elected Pope Innocent XI. On 9 April 1685, he was named camerlengo of the Sacred College of Cardinals.

He died in Rome on 8 May 1688, and was buried in the church of Santa Maria in Vallicella.

Episcopal succession

References

Sources
Cardella, Lorenzo. Memorie storiche de' cardinali della Santa Romana Chiesa, Vol. 7 (Roma: Pagliarini 1793), pp. 231–233.

External links
 (for Chronology of Bishops) 
 (for Chronology of Bishops) 

17th-century Italian Roman Catholic bishops
Bishops appointed by Pope Urban VIII
Bishops appointed by Pope Innocent X
Bishops appointed by Pope Clement X
1607 births
1688 deaths
Clergy from Rome
Somascan bishops
17th-century Italian cardinals
Bishops of Bitonto